Kieran Molloy is a Gaelic footballer who plays as a half-back for Corofin and the Galway county team.

He played for Corofin and University of Galway in the same day in 2018 (All-Ireland Club and Sigerson Cup), rushing to Dublin to play in the Sigerson after the Corofin game.

Molloy was selected as Footballer of the Year at the AIB GAA Club Players' Awards at Croke Park in April 2019. He attempted the same in 2018.

References

Year of birth missing (living people)
Living people
Corofin Gaelic footballers
Gaelic football backs
Galway inter-county Gaelic footballers
University of Galway Gaelic footballers